The Mercedes-Benz Cito (coded as O520) was a low-floor midibus built by EvoBus for Continental Europe between 1999 and 2003. Unusual for buses at that time, it had a diesel-electric transmission and was planned to have a hybrid engine or a fuel cell at a later stage. The Diesel engine was positioned above the rear axle.

The bus was available in three lengths: 8.1 metre, 8.9 metre, and 9.6 metre long and it has a width of 2.35 m. It has a capacity ranged from 31 passengers, 34 passengers and 38 passengers. It was replaced by short wheelbase Mercedes-Benz Citaro K In 2006 which was the successor of the Mercedes-Benz Cito.

See also 
 List of buses
 
 

Cito
Vehicles introduced in 1999
Low-floor buses
Midibuses